Stygnocoris is a genus of dirt-colored seed bugs in the family Rhyparochromidae. There are about 15 described species in Stygnocoris.

Species
These 15 species belong to the genus Stygnocoris:

 Stygnocoris barbieri Pericart, 1993
 Stygnocoris breviceps Wagner, 1953
 Stygnocoris faustus Horvath, 1888
 Stygnocoris fuligineus Geoffroy, 1785
 Stygnocoris mandibularis Montandon, 1889
 Stygnocoris matocqui Pericart, 1993
 Stygnocoris mayeti (Puton, 1879)
 Stygnocoris prionoides (Kolenati, 1845)
 Stygnocoris pygmaeus (Sahlberg, 1848)
 Stygnocoris rusticus (Fallen, 1807)
 Stygnocoris sabulosus (Schilling, 1829)
 Stygnocoris similis Wagner, 1953
 Stygnocoris subglaber (Puton, 1889)
 Stygnocoris truncatus (Horvath In Saunders, 1893)
 Stygnocoris uyttenboogaarti Blote, 1929

References

External links

 

Rhyparochromidae
Articles created by Qbugbot
Pentatomomorpha genera